Horace Byron Warner (March 24, 1876 – October 21, 1915) was an American lawyer and  politician from New York.

Life
He was born on March 24, 1876, in Penfield, Monroe County, New York, the son of Henry Warner and Maria Lucy (Strowger) Warner. He graduated B.A. from Yale College in 1899. He studied law in the office of John Van Voorhis. Warner was the Justice of the Peace for the Town of Penfield from 1903 to 1906. He was admitted to the bar in 1905, and opened a law office in Rochester in 1907.

In November 1913, he was elected as a Progressive to the New York State Assembly (Monroe Co., 1st D.), and was a member of the 137th New York State Legislature in 1914. In November 1914, he ran for re-election, but was defeated by Republican James A. Harris. Harris polled 4,889 votes, and Warner polled 3,302.

Warner died unmarried on October 21, 1915, in Rochester, New York, of septic poisoning; and was buried at the Oakwood Cemetery in Penfield.

References

1876 births
1915 deaths
Politicians from Rochester, New York
Members of the New York State Assembly
New York (state) Progressives (1912)
20th-century American politicians
Yale College alumni
19th-century American politicians
Lawyers from Rochester, New York